Olivia Victoria Anderson (born 18 November 1987) is a South African former cricketer who played as a right-handed batter and wicket-keeper. She appeared in five One Day Internationals and two Twenty20 Internationals for South Africa in 2008. She played domestic cricket for Western Province, KwaZulu-Natal, Devon and Surrey.

In the English 2010 season, she played for Shepperton, both for the ladies team, and the men's second team, in both of which she was the leading run scorer (also coming 5th in the men's league averages) as well as keeping wicket. She was Surrey's leading run-scorer in the 2010 Women's County Championship, with 370 runs.

References

External links
 
 

1987 births
Living people
South African women cricketers
South Africa women One Day International cricketers
South Africa women Twenty20 International cricketers
Western Province women cricketers
KwaZulu-Natal Coastal women cricketers
Devon women cricketers
Surrey women cricketers
20th-century South African women
21st-century South African women